1212 (MCCXII) was a leap year.

1212 may also refer to:
 1212 (7L & Esoteric album), 2010
 1212 (Barbara Manning album), 1997